Kimberley Rutil (born 5 August 1996) is a Congolese handball player for Stella Saint-Maur Handball and the Congolese national team.

She participated at the 2021 World Women's Handball Championship in Spain.

References

1996 births
Living people
Congolese female handball players